This is a list of notable people who were born or have lived in Perm (1940–1957: Molotov), Russia.

Born in Perm

18th century

1701–1800 
 Feodor Pryanishnikov (1793–1867), Russian actual privy councillor and postal administrator

19th century

1801–1900 
 Dmitry Smyshlyayev (1828–1893), Russian historian, ethnographer and politician
 Ivan Larionov (1830–1889), Russian composer, writer and folklorist
 Dmitry Maksutov (1832–1889), Imperial Russian Navy rear-admiral
 Pyotr Vereshchagin (1834–1886), Russian landscape and cityscape painter
 Vasily Vereshchagin (1835–1909), Russian portraitist, history painter and illustrator
 Peter Struve (1870–1944), Russian political economist, philosopher and editor
 Olga Lepeshinskaya (1871–1963), Soviet biologist
 Mikhail Osorgin (1878–1942), Russian writer, journalist, and essayist
 Vasily Kamensky (1884–1961), Russian Futurist poet, playwright and artist
 Ariy Pazovsky (1887–1953), Russian Jewish conductor

20th century

1901–1950 
 Nikolay Moiseyev (1902–1955), Soviet astronomer and expert in celestial mechanics
 Victor Oreshnikov (1904–1987), Soviet Russian painter
 Vladimir Yemelyanov (1911–1975), Soviet actor and producer
 Vladislav Zanadvorov (1914–1942), Soviet writer
 Mikhail Schweitzer (1920–2000), Soviet film director
 Lev Voronin (1928–2006), Soviet Russian official
 Lora Yakovleva (born 1932), Russian woman International Correspondence Chess Grandmaster, the second ICCF Women's World Champion in correspondence chess between 1972 and 1977
 Alexander Bolonkin (born 1933), Russian-American scientist and academic
 Georgi Burkov (1933–1990), Soviet film actor
 Tamara Erofeyeva (born 1937), Soviet and Russian linguist
 Aleksandr Nossov (born 1942), Soviet Nordic combined skier
 Pavel Sadyrin (1942–2001), Soviet and Russian footballer and manager
 Igor Volgin (born 1942), Soviet and Russian writer and historian, poet, specialist in literature

1951–1960 
 Alexander Bortnikov (born 1951), Russian official; Director of the FSB since 2008
 Valentin Stepankov (born 1951), first prosecutor general of the Russian Federation
 Vassily Solomin (1953–1997), Soviet boxer
 Venera Chernyshova (born 1954), Soviet biathlete
 Boris Kondakov (born 1954), Russian specialist in literary criticism, philologist
 Yury Trutnev (born 1956), Russian politician; Minister of Natural Resources and the Environment from 2004 to 2012
 Ludmila Kalinina (born 1957), Russian pair skating coach
 Valentin Yumashev (born 1957), Russian journalist, politician and businessman-developer

1961–1970 
 Andrey Vavilov (born 1961), Russian politician and businessman
 Dmitry Fedoseyev (born 1965), Russian football player (1993–1999), coach (1993–1998) and sports functionary (1993–1999)
 Vladimir Filimonov (born 1965), Russian professional football player
 Igor Gindis (born 1965), Russian journalist, rock musician and actor
 Dmitry Rybolovlev (born 1966), Russian businessman, investor and philanthropist
 Vladislav Kormtshikov (born 1967), Russian ski-orienteering competitor and world champion
 Sergey Nagovitsyn (1968–1999), Russian singer, composer and author of Russian chanson style songs
 Dmitri Sergeyev (born 1968), Russian judoka
 Mikhail Zubkov (born 1968), Russian swimmer
 Dmitri Piskunov (born 1969), Russian professional football coach and a former player
 Andrei Smetanin (born 1969), Russian professional footballer
 Sergey Burdin (born 1970), Russian football player
 Vladimir Chagin (born 1970), Russian rally raid driver
 Yuliana Malkhasyants, Russian choreographer
 Tatiana Borodina, Russian opera soprano

1971–1980 
 Anna Vodovatova (born 1971), Russian journalist
 Andrei Bryukhanov (born 1972), Russian football player
 Aleksandr Tretyakov (born 1972), Russian wrestler who won bronze medal at the 1996 Summer Olympics
 Alexander Gulyavtsev (born 1973), Russian professional ice hockey winger
 Konstantin Paramonov (born 1973), Russian football coach and a former player
 Yevgeni Yarkov (born 1973), Russian football player
 Nikita Belykh (born 1975), Russian politician; Governor of Kirov Oblast since 2009
 Rinat Farkhoutdinov (born 1975), Russian ice dancer
 Tatyana Tomashova (born 1975), Russian middle distance runner
 Sergey Armishev (born 1976), Russian football player
 Nikolai Bardin (born 1976), Russian professional ice hockey winger
Michael Beilin (born 1976), Israeli Olympic Greco-Roman wrestler
 Natalia Tomilova (born 1977), Russian ski-orienteering competitor
 Andrei Tsaplin (born 1977), Russian professional footballer
 Konstantin Zyryanov (born 1977), Russian footballer
 Konstantin Chaschukhin (born 1978), Russian professional ice hockey goaltender
 Aleksei Popov (born 1978), Russian-born Kazakhstani footballer
 Grigori Petrovski (born 1979), Russian pair skater
 Aleksandr Pitchkounov (born 1979), Russian super heavyweight kickboxer and kyokushin karateka competing in K-1
 Yekaterina Shipulina (born 1979), Russian prima ballerina of the Bolshoi Ballet
 Vitali Koval (born 1980), Belarusian professional ice hockey goaltender
 Dmitri Polyanin (born 1980), Russian professional football player
 Alexander Zevakhin (born 1980), Russian professional ice hockey right winger

1981–1985 
 Alexander Chagodayev (born 1981), Russian professional ice hockey forward
 Natalya Korostelyova (born 1981), Russian cross country skier
 Mikhail Kuleshov (born 1981), Russian ice hockey player
 Viktor Polyakov (born 1981), Ukrainian boxer of Russian ethnicity
 Viktoria Shliakhova (born 1981), Russian pair skater
 Tatiana Totmianina (born 1981), Russian pair skater
 Tatyana Veshkurova (born 1981), Russian sprint athlete
 DJ Smash (born 1982), Russian DJ in house music and electronic music
 Ilya Solaryov (born 1982), Kazakhstani professional ice hockey winger of Russian ethnicity
 Vyacheslav Belov (born 1983), Russian professional ice hockey defenceman
 Maxim Trankov (born 1983), Russian pair skater
 Pavel Alikin (born 1984), Russian professional footballer
 Alexandra Kosteniuk (born 1984), Russian chess Grandmaster and a former Women's World Chess Champion
 Alexei Menshikov (born 1984), Russian former pair skater
 Evgeniy Pechenin (born 1984), Russian cross-country mountain biker
 Alexander Popov (born 1984), Russian former pair skater
 Andrei Griazev (born 1985), Russian figure skater
 Dmitri Megalinsky (born 1985), Russian professional ice hockey defenceman
 Alexander Nikulin (born 1985), Russian professional ice hockey player
 Natasha Poly (born 1985), Russian model
 Yevgeni Shipitsin (born 1985), Russian professional football player
 Katerina Shpitsa (born 1985), Russian actress of theater and cinema

1986–1990 
 Kristina Alikina (born 1986), Russian basketball power forward
 Alexander Berkutov (born 1986), Russian professional ice hockey defenceman
 Olga Golovkina (born 1986), Russian athlete
 Nikolay Morilov (born 1986), Russian cross country skier
 Igor Polygalov (born 1986), Russian professional ice hockey forward
 Katya Shchekina (born 1986), Russian model
 Ilia Tkachenko (born 1986), Russian ice dancer
 Vitali Butikov (born 1987), Russian ice dancer
 Maksim Dyldin (born 1987), Russian sprint athlete
 Denis Kazionov (born 1987), Russian professional ice hockey winger
 Mariya Panfilova (born 1987), Russian (2007–2012), Ukrainian (2013–2014) and Belarusian (since 2015) biathlete
 Konstantin Bezmaternikh (born 1988), Russian pair skater
 Marina Mokhnatkina (born 1988), Russian mixed martial artist and sambo competitor
 Natalia Shestakova (born 1988), Russian pair skater
 Artem Borodulin (born 1989), Russian figure skater
 Marina Melnikova (born 1989), Russian tennis player
 Andrei Novoselov (born 1989), Russian pair skater
 Ekaterina Rybolovleva (born 1989), Russian businesswoman, equestrian and socialite
 Andrei Sekretov (born 1989), Russian professional football player
 Arina Ushakova (born 1989), Russian retired pair skater
 Ildar Khairullin (born 1990), Russian chess Grandmaster

1991–2000 
 Liana Churilova (born 1991), Russian-American professional ballroom dancer
 Elena Komendrovskaja (born 1991), Russian female badminton player
 Aleksandr Subbotin (born 1991), Russian professional football player
 Maksim Batov (born 1992), Russian football defender
 Oleg Ponomarev (born 1992), Russian Paralympic Nordic skier
 Yevgeni Tyukalov (born 1992), Russian professional football player
 Sergei Abramov (born 1993), Russian ice hockey player
 Lubov Bakirova (born 1993), Russian pair skater
 Sabina Imaikina (born 1993), Russian pair skater
 Tanya Mityushina (born 1993), Russian fashion model
 Evgeni Klimov (born 1994), Russian Nordic combined skier
 Vasili Aleynikov (born 1995), Russian football player
 Anatoly Golyshev (born 1995), Russian ice hockey forward
 Anastasia Martiusheva (born 1995), Russian pair skater
 Tatiana Tudvaseva (born 1997), Russian pair skater
 Ivan Ivanchenko (born 1998), Russian football player
 Maria Vigalova (born 1999), Russian pair skater

Lived in Perm 
 Vasily Tatishchev (1686–1750), Russian statesman and ethnographer; founded the cities of Perm and Yekaterinburg
 Andrey Voronikhin (1759–1814), Russian architect and painter
 Alexander von Humboldt (1769–1859), Prussian geographer, naturalist and explorer
 Mikhail Speransky (1772–1839), Russian reformist during the reign of Alexander I of Russia
 Alexander Herzen (1812–1870), Russian writer and thinker
 Dmitry Mamin-Sibiryak (1852–1912), Russian author
 Vladimir Korolenko (1853–1921), Russian short story writer, journalist, human rights activist and humanitarian
 Nikolay Slavyanov (1854–1897), Russian inventor
 Alexander Popov (1859–1906), Russian physicist who is acclaimed in his homeland and eastern European countries as the inventor of radio
 Andronik (Nikolsky) (1870–1918), bishop in the Russian Orthodox Church and a saint
 Sergei Diaghilev (1872–1929), Russian art critic, patron, ballet impresario and founder of the Ballets Russes
 Mikhail Shuisky (1883–1953), Russian (people) opera and concert singer
 Boris Pasternak (1890–1960), Soviet and Russian poet, novelist and literary translator; lived in Perm for a time, and it figures in his novel Doctor Zhivago under the fictional name "Yuriatin" where Yuri sees Lara again in the public library
 Arkadiy Shvetsov (1892–1953), Soviet aircraft engine designer
 Margarita Kozhina (1925–2012), Soviet and Russian linguist
 Sergei Toropov (1928–1990), Russian historian and regional ethnographer
 Sergei Belov (1944–2013), Soviet professional basketball player
 Gennady Troshev (1947–2008), Russian Colonel General in the Russian military
 Pyotr Latyshev (1948–2008), Russian politician
 Nikolai Zarubin (1948–1998), Russian artist
 Alexei Ivanov (born 1969), Russian writer

See also 

 List of Russian people
 List of Russian-language poets

Perm, Russia
Perm
List